Aimee-Ffion Edwards (born 21 November 1987) is a Welsh actress and singer. She is known for playing Sketch in Skins, Esme Shelby in Peaky Blinders, Sophie in Detectorists and Abi in Loaded. She also had a starring voice role as Mio in the English dub of Xenoblade Chronicles 3.

Early life
Aimee-Ffion Edwards was born in Newport, Wales. She attended Ysgol Gymraeg Casnewydd (Newport Welsh medium primary school) and Ysgol Gyfun Gwynllyw (Torfaen Welsh medium High School). She played for a local youth rugby team, the only girl in a boys' team, until she was 14. She would often go from ballet lessons to playing for the rugby team.

She took a drama A-level at school, and joined the National Youth Theatre of Wales.

She is fluent in English and Welsh.

Career

Film and television
Edwards appeared in the 2002 short film Dŵr Dwfn.

She was training to be a classical singer when she appeared on the Pop Idol-type Welsh language TV show called Wawffactor in 2006, finishing as runner-up.

Edwards made her television debut as the character Sketch in the E4 series Skins in 2008.

In 2009, she appeared in the Valentine's Day episode of Casualty ("Stand By Me"), as a teenager who finds a replacement speed-date in the wards of Holby City Hospital, and ends up involved in a serious gun-related incident. In the first episode of Casualty 1909 she played a young prostitute called Deborah Lynch, who was being abused by her father.

In 2010, she appeared in an episode of the supernatural BBC drama series Being Human as a theatre usher, who is also a ghost.

In 2011, she appeared in series 2 of the BBC drama series Luther, playing the character Jenny Jones.

In 2012, she appeared in Sky Atlantic's four-part series Walking And Talking, a spin-off from an episode of Sky One's Christmas series of shorts Little Crackers. Aimee played Mary, friend of Kath, played by Ami Metcalf, in these stories written by Kathy Burke and based on her own teenage years.

In 2013, 2014 and 2021, she appeared as Esme, the wife of John Shelby, in the BBC series Peaky Blinders.

In 2014, Edwards appeared in two BBC Cymru Wales television productions celebrating the centenary of Dylan Thomas: as part of an all-Welsh cast in a television adaptation of Thomas' radio drama Under Milk Wood, playing the part 'Laugharne Voice'; and as Marianne in A Poet in New York, Andrew Davies' dramatisation of Thomas' last days.

In 2014, she appeared as Katy in "The Harrowing", the sixth episode of the first series of Inside No. 9, written by Steve Pemberton and Reece Shearsmith.

Edwards played Sophie in the BAFTA award-winning BBC Four comedy series Detectorists; series 1 in 2014 and series 2 in 2015.

In 2016, she appeared as Sian in Death in Paradise as a young girl who is murdered.

In 2017, she was Josh's (ex)-girlfriend in the Channel 4 comedy Loaded.
In 2019, she was Miss Aitken in BBC Three's comedy series Man Like Mobeen.

Stage
Edwards made her stage debut in 2008 in SH*T-M*X at the Trafalgar Studios in London.

In 2009, she performed in Jez Butterworth's play Jerusalem at the Royal Court Theatre, alongside Mackenzie Crook.

In 2011, she made her Broadway debut, reprising her role in Jerusalem at the Music Box Theatre, New York. She appeared in the London revival of Jerusalem later that year.

In 2012, she appeared in The Recruiting Officer at the Donmar Warehouse, and in Marius von Mayenburg's Fireface at the Young Vic.

In 2013, she appeared as Avonia Bunn in Trelawny of the Wells at the Donmar Warehouse.

In 2017, she played Marcella in B, a new play by Guillermo Calderón which had a limited run at the Royal Court Theatre.

Filmography

Film

Television

Video games

References

External links
 

1987 births
Living people
21st-century Welsh actresses
21st-century Welsh women singers
People from Newport, Wales
Welsh stage actresses
Welsh television actresses
Welsh film actresses
Welsh video game actresses
Welsh voice actresses